List of Danish government ministries, past and present. In Denmark, ministries change often, both when new governments are installed and during specific governments rule. Names are changed, the organizational structure is changed, some ministries are fused, some are discontinued, some are revived, some are newly created. There are currently 18 ministries in the Cabinet of Denmark. The Minister for Nordic Cooperation serves as a minister without portfolio, and thus no "Ministry of Nordic Cooperation" exists.

Current Danish ministries

 Ministry of the State
 Ministry of Business and Growth
 Ministry of Culture
 Ministry of Defence
 Ministry of Ecclesiastical Affairs is with the Ministry of Education
 Ministry for Children, Education and Gender Equality
 Ministry of Employment
 Ministry of Energy, Utilities and Climate
 Ministry of Environment and Food 
 Ministry of Finance
 Ministry of Foreign Affairs
 Ministry of Health
 Ministry of Higher Education and Science
 Ministry of Immigration, Integration and Housing Affairs
 Ministry of Justice
 Ministry of Social affairs and the Interior
 Ministry of Taxation
 Ministry of Transport and Building

Discontinued or former, formal or informal names of ministries

Sources

 Rigsarkivets Samlinger Danish National Archives ("Rigsarkivet")
 Statsministerier - Ministries